Hemidactylus prashadi, also known commonly as the Bombay leaf-toed gecko or Prashad's gecko, is a species of lizard in the family Gekkonidae. The species is endemic to the Western Ghats of India.

Etymology
The specific name, prashadi, is in honor of Indian zoologist Baini Prashad (1894–1969).

Geographic range
H. prashadi is found in India (former Bombay Presidency).

Type locality: "neighbourhood of Jog, N. Kanara district, Bombay Presidency".

Habitat

Description

Reproduction
H. prashadi is oviparous.

References

Further reading
Bansal R, Karanth KP (2010). "Molecular phylogeny of Hemidactylus geckos (Squamata: Gekkonidae) of the Indian subcontinent reveals a unique Indian radiation and an Indian origin of Asian house geckos". Molecular Phylogenetics and Evolution 57 (1): 459–465.
Bauer AM, Jackman TR, Greenbaum E, Giri VB, De Silva A (2010). "South Asia supports a major endemic radiation of Hemidactylus geckos". Molecular Phylogenetics and Evolution 57 (1): 343–352. 
Grossman W (2014). "Hemidactylus prashadi Smith, 1935 – Prashads Halbfinger Gecko im Terrarium ". Sauria 36 (2): 43–54. (in German).
Rösler H (2000). "Kommentierte Liste der rezent, subrezent und fossil bekannte Geckotaxa (Reptilia: Gekkonomorpha)". Gekkota 2: 28–153. (Hemidactylus prashadi, p. 87). (in German).

Hemidactylus
Reptiles described in 1935